Huronia may refer to:
Huronia (region), a region in the Canadian province of Ontario related to the Wyandot people
Huronia (cephalopod), a genus of mollusks